Al Perkins (born January 18, 1944) is an American guitarist known primarily for his steel guitar work. The Gibson guitar company called Perkins "the world's most influential dobro player" and began producing an "Al Perkins Signature" Dobro in 2001—designed and autographed by Perkins.

Early years
Al Perkins was born and raised in Texas and learned to play Hawaiian steel guitar at the age of 9. In the 1950s Perkins was considered a child prodigy, playing with regional country and western bands, appearing on TV/radio, and winning several talent contests. In the early 1960s, Perkins began playing electric guitar with west Texas rock bands, and was discovered by Mickey Jones and Kenny Rogers of The First Edition. By 1966, he enlisted into the Army National Guard and was discharged from the US Army Reserves in 1970.

1970s
In 1970, Perkins joined the east Texas country rock band, Shiloh, and moved to California. The band included Don Henley and future producer/record executive Jim Ed Norman. Perkins was then hired to play in the new incarnation of the Flying Burrito Brothers and recorded the live album The Last of the Red Hot Burritos in 1972. Perkins, along with Chris Hillman, formerly of The Byrds, went on to join Stephen Stills' Manassas, whose material fused Latin, rock, blues, country, folk, and bluegrass influences. He also played steel guitar on the Rolling Stones' song, "Torn and Frayed" on Exile on Main St.

With Stills working with Crosby Stills and Nash, Perkins and Hillman joined Richie Furay (Buffalo Springfield and Poco founding member) and J.D. Souther in the Souther–Hillman–Furay Band. Perkins moved into record production in the mid-1970s, but did tour again with Michael Nesmith and McGuinn & Hillman. As a session player, Perkins contributed to many notable albums, including the Eagles' On the Border.

He joined the British band Ark in 1977 and recorded the album The Angels Come.

1980s
Continuing his production work into the 1980s, Perkins also toured with Chris Hillman as a duo before joining Dolly Parton in 1986, touring and recording with her for several years before moving to Nashville.

In Nashville Perkins formed a new project called The Nash Ramblers with Emmylou Harris, with whom he had worked previously on the two solo albums recorded by Gram Parsons. (It was his association with Parsons that led to Perkins being called in to play on the sessions for the Rolling Stones' Exile on Main Street). The Live at the Ryman album was to win Perkins his first Grammy award in 1992.

Perkins is listed playing pedal steel guitar on two albums by Christian singer Don Francisco: Holiness and One Heart at a Time.

1990s–present
Al Perkins continues to tour and record. To date, other artists Al Perkins has played for are: James Taylor, Bob Dylan, Tori Amos, Garth Brooks, Dwight Yoakam, Dan Fogelberg, Joe Walsh, Mike Love, Solomon Burke, Patty Loveless, Cher, Rita Coolidge, Iris DeMent, Michael Martin Murphey, Buddy Miller, Tommy Womack, Yo La Tengo, and Jim Lauderdale.

In 2002 Perkins released a collection of studio outtakes and rare recordings. Snapshots features recordings by the Nash Ramblers and the Flying Burrito Brothers among others. This was followed in 2003 by Triple Play, Perkins' first solo album, revealing blues, country, bluegrass, gospel and Cajun influences.

Perkins appeared on stage alongside James Burton and Keith Richards at the Gram Parsons tribute show in California in summer 2004.

Throughout the 2000s Perkins toured periodically with the Road Trippers, a band led by Kevin Montgomery and occasionally included Mike McAdam and Mavericks Paul Deakin and Robert Reynolds.

In 2009, Perkins formed Big Dog 3, a trio with bassist Chris Donohue and drummer Brady Blade. Big Dog 3's self-titled debut album features guests such as Jim Lauderdale and Emmylou Harris. Today Al Perkins performs with The HiPower Band, which includes vocalist Kristine Arnold (Sweethearts of the Rodeo).

Awards

Grammy Awards
 1997 – Producer on Best Southern, Country, or Bluegrass Gospel Album
 1992 – Best Country Performance by a Duo or Group With Vocal
 1991 – Best Bluegrass Album

Other awards
 2015 – Induction to the Colorado Music Hall of Fame (Manassas)
 2007 – 'Musician of the Year' Texas Music Awards
 1997 – Induction to The Texas Steel Guitar Hall of Fame
 1993 – Induction to Opryland's Starwalk
 1985 – Indie Award for album production on Desert Rose

Collaborations
With Dolly Parton
 Here You Come Again (RCA Victor, 1977)
 Dolly, Dolly, Dolly (RCA Victor, 1981)
 Rainbow (Columbia Records, 1987)
 Hungry Again (Decca Records, 1998)

With Dan Fogelberg
 Souvenirs (Epic Records, 1974)
 Captured Angel (Epic Records, 1975)
 Nether Lands (Epic Records, 1977)
 The Innocent Age (Epic Records, 1981)
 High Country Snows (Epic Records, 1985)

With Randy Newman
 Good Old Boys (Reprise Records, 1974)

With John Wesley Harding
 The Confessions of St. Ace (Mammoth Records, 2000)

With Michael Nesmith
 Infinite Rider on the Big Dogma (Pacific Arts, 1979)

With Jim Lauderdale
 Planet of Love (Reprise Records, 1991)
 Persimmons (Rounder Records, 1996)
 Patchwork River (Thirty Tigers, 2010)
 I'm a Song (Sky Crunch Records, 2014)

With Rita Coolidge
 The Lady's Not for Sale (A&M Records, 1972)
 Fall into Spring (A&M Records, 1974)
 It's Only Love (A&M Records, 1975)
 Anytime...Anywhere (A&M Records, 1977)

With Bob Dylan
 Knocked Out Loaded (Columbia Records, 1986)

With Bob Bennett
 First Things First (Maranatha! Records, 1979)

With George Ducas
 Where I Stand (Capitol Records, 1997)

With Terry Reid
 Seed of Memory (ABC Records, 1976)

With Russ Taff
 Winds of Change (Warner Bros. Records, 1995)

With Dwight Yoakam
 Buenas Noches From a Lonely Room (Reprise Records, 1988)
 If There Was a Way (Reprise Records, 1990)
 This Time (Reprise Records, 1993)
 A Long Way Home (Reprise Records, 1998)

With Eagles
 On the Border (Asylum Records, 1974)

With Michael Martin Murphey
 High Stakes (Murphey Kinship Recordings, 2016)

With Juice Newton
 Ain't Gonna Cry (RCA Records, 1989)

With Richie Furay
 I've Got a Reason (Asylum Records, 1976)
 Dance a Little Light (Asylum Records, 1978)
 Seasons of Change (Myrrh Records, 1982)
 The Heartbeat of Love (Always An Adventure, 2006)

With Garth Brooks
 Sevens (Capitol Records, 1997)

With Gene Clark
 Two Sides to Every Story (RSO, 1977)

With Kate Campbell
 Songs from the Levee (Compass Records, 1994)
 Moonpie Dreams (Demon Records, 1997)

With Joe Nichols
 III (Universal South Records, 2005)

With Wynonna Judd
 The Other Side (Curb Records, 1997)

With Chris Hillman
 Slippin' Away (Asylum Records, 1976)
 Morning Sky (Sugar Hill Records, 1982)
 Desert Rose (Sugar Hill Records, 1984)

With Billy Preston
 The Kids & Me (A&M Records, 1974)

With Solomon Burke
 Nashville (Shout! Factory, 2006)

With Mark Heard
 Appalachian Melody (Solid Rock, 1979)
 Eye of the Storm (Home Sweet Home, 1983)

With Roger McGuinn
 Peace on You (Columbia Records, 1974)

With Steve Forbert
 Rocking Horse Heads (Revolution Records, 1996)

With Bill LaBounty
 Bill LaBounty (Warner Bros. Records, 1982)

With Tim Easton
 Special 20 (Heathen Records, 1998)

With Miranda Lambert
 Palomino (RCA Records, 2022)

With Steve Camp
 Justice (Sparrow Records, 1988)

With Michelle Shocked
 Short Sharp Shocked (Mercury Records, 1988)

With Jill Sobule
 Jill Sobule (Atlantic Records, 1995)
 Happy Town (Atlantic Records, 1997)
 Underdog Victorious (Artemis Records, 2004)

With Tori Amos
 From the Choirgirl Hotel (Atlantic Records, 1998)

With Tom Rush
 Voices (Appleseed Records, 2018)

With Emmylou Harris
 Cowgirl's Prayer (Warner Bros. Records, 1993)

With Leonard Cohen
 Death of a Ladies' Man (Columbia Records, 1977)

With John Prine
 In Spite of Ourselves (Oh Boy Records, 1999)
 For Better, or Worse (Oh Boy Records, 2016)

With Donna Summer
 Bad Girls (Casablanca Records, 1979)

With James Taylor
 Gorilla (Warner Bros. Records, 1975)

With John Denver
 The Flower That Shattered the Stone (Windstar Records, 1990)

With Gram Parsons
 GP (Reprise Records, 1973)
 Grievous Angel (Reprise Records, 1974)

With Cher
 Cher (Casablanca Records, 1979)

With Joe Walsh
 Barnstorm (ABC Records, 1972)

References

Further reading

External links
 
 HiPower Band Website

1944 births
Living people
People from Odessa, Texas
American country guitarists
American male guitarists
Pedal steel guitarists
The Flying Burrito Brothers members
Souther–Hillman–Furay Band members
The Desert Rose Band members
Guitarists from Texas
20th-century American guitarists
People from DeKalb, Texas
Country musicians from Texas
20th-century American male musicians